Shana Frost Matini (born April 18, 1970) is an associate judge of the Superior Court of the District of Columbia. In February 2018, Matini was nominated by President Donald Trump to a 15-year term as an associate judge on the Superior Court of the District of Columbia. She was confirmed by the U.S. Senate on August 1, 2019. Her official investiture ceremony took place on January 10, 2020. Matini was a magistrate judge on the Superior Court of the District of Columbia from 2016 to 2019.

Matini received her Bachelor of Arts from George Washington University and her Juris Doctor from the District of Columbia School of Law. After law school, she clerked for Richard A. Levie of the Superior Court of the District of Columbia.

Prior to becoming a judge, Matini taught English at the Language Teacher's Training College in Slupsk, Poland. She served as an assistant attorney general in the Office of the Attorney General for the District of Columbia. Matini has also served as senior legal fellow for the Einstein Institute for Science, Health and the Courts.

References

1970 births
Living people
21st-century American judges
21st-century American lawyers
21st-century American women judges
21st-century American women lawyers
David A. Clarke School of Law alumni
George Washington University alumni
Judges of the Superior Court of the District of Columbia
Lawyers from Washington, D.C.
People from Vineland, New Jersey